Lungotevere Aventino is the part of the lungotevere connecting the ponte Palatino to Piazza dell'Emporio, in Rome, in the rione Ripa.

The Lungotevere corresponds to the slopes of Cermalus, the area of the Palatine Hill under which, according to legend, Romulus and Remus were picked from the waters of the Tiber, after being abandoned in a basket.

Above the Lungotevere are situated two parks, Sant'Alessio and the Parco Savello.

References

Sources 

Aventino
Streets in Rome R. XII Ripa